Colin de Grandhomme (born 22 July 1986) is a former Zimbabwean-born New Zealand international cricketer.

Early, domestic and T20 career
Born in Harare, de Grandhomme, who attended St. George's College, Harare, began his career by playing for Manicaland in Zimbabwe, and was part of the Zimbabwe team at the 2004 Under-19 Cricket World Cup in Bangladesh. He played for Auckland in New Zealand domestic cricket from 2006 until 2018. In 2017, he played in England for Warwickshire County Cricket Club after having played for Kolkata Knight Riders in the 2017 Indian Premier League. 

In May 2018, he signed for Northern Districts ahead of the 2018–19 New Zealand domestic season. He played for Royal Challengers Bangalore in the 2018 and 2019 IPL seasons. In May 2021, he was signed by Hampshire for the T20 Blast. In 2021, he was drafted by Southern Brave for the inaugural season of The Hundred. In 2023 it was announced that de Grandhomme would be playing for Lancashire in both the County Championship and the T20 Blast.

International career
After representing Zimbabwe in the U19 World Cup, de Grandhomme moved to New Zealand, making his international debut on 11 February 2012 in a Twenty20 International against Zimbabwe. His One Day International (ODI) debut came against South Africa on 3 March 2012. In November 2016, de Grandhomme was named in New Zealand's Test squad for the side against the touring Pakistanis and debuted in the first Test match on 17 November. He scored a half-century and took a five-wicket haul on debut, winning the player of the match award.

On 2 December 2017, against the touring West Indies, de Grandhomme scored his first Test century. The 71-ball century was the second-fastest century in Tests by a New Zealand batsman. He left the tour ahead of the ODI matches against the West Indies after the death of his father in Zimbabwe.

In May 2018, de Grandhomme was one of twenty players to be awarded a new contract for the 2018–19 season by New Zealand Cricket. In April 2019, he was named in New Zealand's squad for the 2019 Cricket World Cup.
He announced his retirement from international cricket on 31st August 2022.

See also
 List of New Zealand cricketers who have taken five-wicket hauls on Test debut

References

External links

1986 births
Alumni of St. George's College, Harare
Auckland cricketers
Cricketers at the 2019 Cricket World Cup
Cricketers from Harare
Cricketers who have taken five wickets on Test debut
Hampshire cricketers
Jamaica Tallawahs cricketers
Kolkata Knight Riders cricketers
Living people
Manicaland cricketers
Midlands cricketers
Nagenahira Nagas cricketers
Naturalised citizens of New Zealand
New Zealand cricketers
New Zealand One Day International cricketers
New Zealand Test cricketers
New Zealand Twenty20 International cricketers
Northern Districts cricketers
North Island cricketers
Royal Challengers Bangalore cricketers
Southern Brave cricketers
Saint Lucia Kings cricketers
Warwickshire cricketers
Zimbabwean cricketers
Zimbabwean emigrants to New Zealand
White Zimbabwean people